Hallo, Onkel Doc! is a German television series. It was produced by Sat.1 from 1994 to 2000 and broadcast for the first time.

See also
List of German television series

External links
 

German medical television series
1994 German television series debuts
2000 German television series endings
German-language television shows
Sat.1 original programming